Bromus lepidus, the slender soft brome, is a species of flowering plant in the family Poaceae. It has a disjunct distribution, native to central and northern Europe, and Xinjiang in China, and introduced to an assortment of other locales, including some northeast states of the United States, the Canary Islands, and Egypt. The taxonomic history of this species has been marked by nomenclatural issues.

References

lepidus
Flora of Ireland
Flora of Great Britain
Flora of Denmark
Flora of Sweden
Flora of France
Flora of Belgium
Flora of Czechoslovakia
Flora of Germany
Flora of Xinjiang
Plants described in 1924